The 1916 United States presidential election in Illinois was held on November 7, 1916 as part of the 1916 United States presidential election. State voters chose 29 electors to the Electoral College, who voted for president and vice president.

Illinois was won by the Republican nominee Charles Evans Hughes with 52.56% of the popular vote. Hughes was the first presidential candidate to garner over a million votes in a single state, due to Illinois having allowed women to cast votes for electors, though not yet for  other offices.

With 52.56% of the vote, Illinois would prove to be Hughes' fifth strongest state in terms of popular votes percentage after Vermont, New Jersey, Pennsylvania and Iowa.

This is the second of only three elections in the history of the party that a Democrat won the presidency without winning Illinois (the others being 1884 and 1976).

Primaries
The general election coincided with the general election for House as well as those for state offices.

Turnout
The total vote in the state-run primary elections (Democratic, Republican, Progressive, Socialist) was 311,486. The total vote in the general election was 2,192,707. Both major parties (Democratic and Republican), as well as the Progressive Party and Socialist Party, all held non-binding state-run preferential primaries on April 11.

Democratic

The 1916 Illinois Democratic presidential primary was held on April 11, 1916 in the U.S. state of Illinois as one of the Democratic Party's state primaries ahead of the 1916 presidential election.

The popular vote was a non-binding "beauty contest". Delegates were instead elected by direct votes by congressional district on delegate candidates. Delegate candidates either were listed on the ballot with their preference on for a particular presidential candidate, or were listed as expressing no preference.

Republican

The 1916 Illinois Republican presidential primary was held on April 11, 1916 in the U.S. state of Illinois as one of the Republican Party's state primaries ahead of the 1916 presidential election.

The preference vote was a "beauty contest". Delegates were instead selected by direct-vote in each congressional districts on delegate candidates. Delegate candidates either were listed on the ballot with their preference on for a particular presidential candidate, or were listed as expressing no preference.

Progressive

The 1916 Illinois Progressive presidential primary was held on April 11, 1916 in the U.S. state of Illinois as one of the Progressive Party's state primaries ahead of the 1916 presidential election.

Socialist

The 1916 Illinois Socialist presidential primary was held on April 11, 1916 in the U.S. state of Illinois as one of the Socialist Party's state primaries ahead of the 1916 presidential election.

Results

Results by county

See also
 United States presidential elections in Illinois

References

Illinois
1916
1916 Illinois elections